The Ngarachamayong Culture Center is a cultural center in Koror, Palau.

History
The idea for the establishment of the cultural center originated when a group of visionary women held a special meeting to discuss ways of preserving the culture and tradition of the Palauan people. The meeting led to the establishment of a series of Mechesil Belau Conferences. During these conferences the idea to establish a cultural center was born. Subsequently, the Ngarachamayong, Inc. was incorporated. The cultural center was then constructed with funding from the Government of Palau and the Government of the Republic of China.

Exhibitions
The cultural center exhibits the people and culture of the Palauan people. It also regularly hosts musical events.

References

Buildings and structures in Koror
Cultural centers